Tom Michael Lampe Wigley is a climate scientist at the University of Adelaide. He is also affiliated with the University Corporation for Atmospheric Research (UCAR). He was named a fellow of the American Association for the Advancement of Science (AAAS) for his major contributions to climate and carbon cycle modeling and to climate data analysis, and because he is "one of the world's foremost experts on climate change and one of the most highly cited scientists in the discipline."  His h-index (April 2019) is 107, one of the highest in the discipline. He contributed to many of the reports published by the Intergovernmental Panel on Climate Change (the work of the IPCC, including the contributions of many scientists, was recognised by the joint award of the 2007 Nobel Peace Prize).

Wigley was educated as a mathematical physicist and earned his doctorate at the University of Adelaide in Australia. He served as director of the Climatic Research Unit at the University of East Anglia in the United Kingdom from 1978 to 1993. In 1993 he went on to the  National Center for Atmospheric Research in Boulder, Colorado, where he was appointed a senior scientist in 1994. He subsequently moved to the University of Adelaide where he currently (2014) holds a Professorial Fellowship.

His published papers include the first paper to demonstrate 20th century warming using both land and marine data, the first paper to include the effects of aerosol cooling on projections of future climate change, the first paper to provide realistic scenarios for the stabilization of atmospheric , and the first paper to use pattern-based methods to identify a significant human influence on the climate. Wigley has also published a number of highly cited papers in aqueous geochemistry, including a now-standard method for carbon dating of groundwater. Wigley has argued in the popular media that the IPCC has been too optimistic about the prospect of averting harmful climate change by reducing greenhouse emissions through the use of renewable technologies alone, and argued that any realistic portfolio must include significant contributions from nuclear energy. He has also pointed out that "the human-induced changes that are expected over the next 100 years are much, much greater than any changes that societies experienced in the past." In 2013, with other leading experts, he was co-author of an open letter to policy makers, which stated that "continued opposition to nuclear power threatens humanity's ability to avoid dangerous climate change."

Articles

References

Year of birth missing (living people)
Living people
Australian climatologists
Academics of the University of East Anglia
Fellows of the American Association for the Advancement of Science
National Center for Atmospheric Research faculty
Academic staff of the University of Adelaide
Fellows of the American Meteorological Society